Le storie di Farland is an Italian television series.

See also
List of Italian television series

External links
 

1993 Italian television series debuts
1994 Italian television series endings
Italian children's animated action television series
Italian children's animated adventure television series
Italian children's animated comedy television series